James Wesley Wilson (born June 6, 1973) is a former American football offensive tackle. He was signed by the Carolina Panthers as an undrafted free agent in 1997 and would play three seasons in the National Football League (NFL). He played college football at Marshall.

At Marshall, Wilson was a member of the 1996 NCAA Division I-AA National Championship team. In 2019, he was inducted into the Marshall Athletics Hall of Fame.

Wilson was signed as an undrafted free agent by the Panthers in 1997. However, Wilson never appeared in a regular season game with Carolina. He spent the 1998 season on injured reserve and was traded prior to the 1999 season. He appeared in five games with the Indianapolis Colts in 1999.

References

1973 births
Living people
American football offensive tackles
Carolina Panthers players
Indianapolis Colts players
Marshall Thundering Herd football players
Players of American football from Virginia
Sportspeople from Newport News, Virginia